The Open Computing Facility is an ASUC
chartered program at the University of California, Berkeley, first founded in
1989.

The OCF is an all-volunteer, student-run, student-initiated service group
dedicated to free computing for the greater academic community of the
University of California, Berkeley. Its stated mission is to
provide an environment where no member of Berkeley's campus community
is denied the computer resources he or she seeks, and to appeal to all
members of the Berkeley campus community with unsatisfied computing
needs and to provide a place for those interested in computing to
fully explore that interest. Here, the term
"campus community" does not include all area residents and excludes
those persons without official connection to either the university or 
a university-sanctioned 
organisation.

As part of the OCF's goal of being open and inclusive, the OCF publishes
its board meeting minutes,
tech talks,
and Unix system administration DeCal materials 
online for all to see.

The OCF provides the following services to UC
Berkeley:
 A Debian Linux computer lab
 Webhosting for individuals and student groups
 Linux shell access
 Email forwarding
 Limited free printing per day and per semester
 Software mirrors of popular Linux distributions and open source projects, available over rsync, http, and https
 A Unix system administration DeCal

References

External links 
 Open Computing Facility
 Open Computing Facility Documentation
 Open Computing Facility Status Blog

Open Computing Facility
1989 establishments in California